James R. Rayl (June 21, 1941 – January 20, 2019) was an American professional basketball player in the ABA. He was a 6'2" and 175 lb guard.

High school career
Born in Kokomo, Indiana, Rayl went to Kokomo High School from 1956 to 1959. He was named 1959's Indiana Mr. Basketball and the recipient of the Trester Award for the state of Indiana his senior year.

College career
Rayl attended Indiana University from 1959 to 1963, where he was an All-American his junior and senior seasons. Rayl averaged 20.6 ppg for his career and still holds the Hoosier single-game scoring record of 56 points, which he did twice against Michigan State and Minnesota. He shot 41.6 percent from the floor and 83.5 percent from the line in 68 games as a Hoosier.

Professional career
Jimmy Rayl was selected by the Cincinnati Royals in the third round and 23rd pick of the 1963 NBA draft. He later signed and played two seasons for the Indiana Pacers. He held a career average of 11.1 ppg.

Death
Rayl died at his home in Kokomo on January 20, 2019, at age 77.

References

External links

1941 births
2019 deaths
All-American college men's basketball players
Amateur Athletic Union men's basketball players
American men's basketball players
Basketball players from Indiana
Cincinnati Royals draft picks
Indiana Hoosiers men's basketball players
Indiana Pacers players
Parade High School All-Americans (boys' basketball)
Point guards
Shooting guards
Sportspeople from Kokomo, Indiana